Mànran are a Scottish band that was established in June 2010. Mànran is a Gaelic word for a melodic sound or a sweet tone.  Since 2010 they have performed in over 30 countries worldwide including several international folk & world music festivals, won awards home and abroad and were invited to do a special one-off concert for the 2012 London Olympics.

The band embarked on their first trip to America in 2013 which was filmed by BBC ALBA for a one-hour-long documentary.

Career

2011: Breakthrough
On 17 January 2011 the band released their first single "Latha Math" and were aiming to be the first Gaelic song in the Top 40 for the 21st Century. While the band reached 29 mid-week, they slipped out of the top 40 to Number 61 for the official chart on Sunday 23 January 2011. However, they did secure Number 6 in both the UK Indie Chart and the Scottish Singles Chart. In August 2012 they released "Take You There (Mànran & Michelle McManus song)|Take You There" with Michelle McManus to raise money for the STV Appeal 2012. Mànran and Michelle McManus performed the song live on 7 September 2012 on the STV Appeal show.

2012–present

In September 2012, Calum Stewart left the band to be replaced by Irish Uilleann Piper/ Flautist Ryan Murphy.

The band recorded their second album The Test in early 2013 which they released in May of the same year. The album won a German critics choice award in December 2013. In August of that year the band made its debut in America at the world-renowned Milwaukee Irish festival in Wisconsin, followed by a five-week tour that saw the band play in Chicago, Bay City, New Hampshire, Albany, California, Arizona and Iowa. After America, the band went to Australia to perform at the Australasian World Music Festival to critical acclaim.

In 2014 they were awarded International Artist of the Year at the Australian Celtic Music Awards.
In 2017, Mànran released their third studio album An Dà Là, whose title song, criticizing the election of Donald Trump to the US presidency, was noted for "invok[ing] the voice of Gaeldom, spanning centuries as it flows between a lament for the past and an anthem for the future".

In 2018 they performed at the Celtic Connections festival which was live-streamed to 125,000 people, and toured France, Germany and Denmark.

In 2019 Mànran toured Australia for five weeks and gaelic singer Kim Carnie and guitarist Aidan Moodie joined the band.

As of January 2021 Mànran are recording a new album.

Discography

Albums

Singles

References

External links
Official website

Celtic music groups
Scottish folk music groups
Musical groups established in 2010
Scottish Gaelic music
2010 establishments in Scotland